Steve Rivera (born August 5, 1954 in Pensacola, Florida) is a former American football Wide Receiver from the University of California. He played in the NFL for the Chicago Bears and San Francisco 49ers.

High school years
Rivera attended Banning High School in Wilmington, California. He was a two-year letterman in football where he was starting Receiver. Rivera led the team in receptions and receiving yardage his senior year. Rivera also was named to the All Marine League and Los Angeles City 1st Team as a receiver. Rivera was receiving his passes from Quarterback Vince Ferragamo who also went on to play in the NFL. The Ferragamo to Rivera air bomb was one of the most feared high school tandems in the United States their senior year.

College career
Rivera inked a letter of intent with the University of California Golden Bears, where he was named 1975 Consensus All-America Team. Rivera was a receiver and punt-return specialist. Rivera had 138 career receptions and 2085 receiving yard for 9 total touchdowns.

Professional career
Rivera was drafted in the fourth round with the 100th pick of the 1976 NFL Draft by the San Francisco 49ers. He also a briefly with the Chicago Bears for three games and then traded back to the San Francisco 49ers in 1977. He spent the 1978 season on injured reserve before being released in 1979. Steve works in construction. http://cheslerconstructioninc.com/about/

References

1954 births
Living people
All-American college football players
American football wide receivers
California Golden Bears football players
Chicago Bears players
San Francisco 49ers players
People from Pensacola, Florida